Lisa Jayne Forey (born 6 July 1977) in Morriston is a Welsh international lawn and indoor bowler.

Bowls career
In 2011, she won three medals including two golds at the European Bowls Championships in Portugal. She won a bronze medal in the triples and fours at the 2012 World Outdoor Bowls Championship in Adelaide.

Forey became a British champion after winning the 2016 pairs with Barbara Griffith, at the British Isles Bowls Championships.

References 

1977 births
Welsh female bowls players
Living people
Bowls European Champions